The 1967 Texas–Arlington Rebels football team was an American football team that represented the University of Texas at Arlington in the Southland Conference during the 1967 NCAA College Division football season. In their second year under head coach Burley Bearden, the team compiled a 10–1 record, were Southland Conference champion and won the Pecan Bowl.

Schedule

References

Texas–Arlington
Texas–Arlington Mavericks football seasons
Southland Conference football champion seasons
Texas–Arlington Rebels football